Elisa Marina Alvarado is an American director, actress, educator, social worker, practitioner of traditional Mexican medicine, and dancer. Born in San Jose, California, Elisa Alvarado is a director and community organizer of Purépecha and Cuban descent. She is perhaps best known as the founder and long-time Artistic Director of the San Jose-based Chicano Teatro Visión theater company. Teatro Visión is a leading Chicano theater company in the Latino theater scene, known especially for adapting classic Mexican novels and films for the stage to increase cultural awareness. She is currently invested in two theater programs Codices and the Instituto de Teatro, which produce new works by Latino playwrights and offer comprehensive training in culture-based theater.

Personal life and career 
Elisa Alvarado was born in San Jose, California, to Blanca Alvarado and Jose J. Alvarado. Her parents gave her access to books and the arts, and instilled values of social justice, spurring her natural talent and passion for the arts. Her passion for theater, as well social change through theater, was sparked in high school in the 1970s after a performance by the legendary theater company El Teatro Campesino. Shortly after, she joined the San Jose-based theater company Teatro de la Gente and toured through San Jose, Mexico, and the American Southwest. After a few years with Teatro de la Gente, Alvarado and other women in Women in Teatro formed an all-female company called Teatro Huipil, named after the Huipil, a traditional garment worn by indigenous women in Mexico and Central America. After disagreement over vision for the company, many of the co-founders left, and Alvarado renamed the company Teatro Visión. Alvarado went on to act as Artistic Director for Teatro Visión for 33 years, until 2017, when she gave the position to her protégé Rodrigo García.

On July 31, 2012, Alvarado suffered a stroke while at a family reunion in New Mexico. She recovered fully and the period of inactivity prompted a restructuring of Teatro Visión to a more sustainable business model.

Recently, Alvarado spent more time with the other programs that she belongs to or founded. In addition to her new works program Codices and her theatrical education program Instituto de Teatro, she is a member of the Native Family Outreach and Education project and the City of San José Independent Police Auditor Community Advisory Committee. She works as a Clinical Social Worker Specialist in San Jose and founded the Ethnomedicine Project that offers training in traditional Mexican medicine. She taught at San Jose State University, San Francisco State University, and Palo Alto High School.

Awards 
In 2010 Alvarado received the James McEntee Lifetime Achievement award, and in 2016 Theatre Bay Area selected her as one of 40 individuals pivotal in building the prestige of the Bay Area theater community. In 2010 she was selected for the Silicon Valley Business Journal's Women of Achievement, and received the City of San Jose's Cornerstone of the Arts award in 2017.

Productions by Teatro Visión

References

Living people
Year of birth missing (living people)
People from San Jose, California
Actresses from San Jose, California
American theatre directors
American actresses of Mexican descent
Women theatre directors
Drama teachers
American people of Purépecha descent
American people of Cuban descent
21st-century American women
Dancers from California